Stanislava "Stasė" Bubulytė (born 5 May 1945) is a retired Lithuanian rower who won two gold and two silver medals in the eights event at the European Championships of 1963–1966. After graduating from the Vilnus University, she worked as mechanical engineer and designer in Vilnius (1969–1999), and later at Sigma tools (1999–2003).

References

1945 births
Living people
Lithuanian female rowers
Soviet female rowers
European Rowing Championships medalists